is a 2008 Japanese film directed by Shinji Higuchi. A remake of the 1958 Akira Kurosawa film The Hidden Fortress, it was released on 10 May 2008.

Plot

Makabe Rokurota (Hiroshi Abe), a loyal retainer of Princess Yuki (Masami Nagasawa), has been commissioned to transport Yuki and Akizuki's ample treasury of gold bars safely to the politically stable Hayakawa. They disguise themselves as humble firewood peddlers, hiding the gold bars inside the logs they are carrying so as to pass safely through roadblocks set up by Yamana, which is under the control of Takayama Gyobu (Kippei Shiina), whose attire bears a striking resemblance to that of Darth Vader.

Along the way, Rokurota comes across Takezo (Jun Matsumoto) and Shimpachi (Daisuke Miyagawa), who have escaped from forced labor in a gold mine. Takezo and Shimpachi first frown on joining the journey, but eventually agree to help out in the hope of escaping Yamana's oppression and cashing in on the gold reward Rokurota offers them.

Cast

Production

Principal photography began on 1 November 2007. Filming locations included Mount Aso, Kumamoto Castle, Ibaraki Prefecture, and Shizuoka Prefecture.

Release

The film premiered on 17 April 2008 at the Tokyo Dome City Hall, and was released theatrically in Japan on 10 May 2008. An early screening was held on 27 April 2018 at the University of Southern California in Los Angeles, garnering positive reactions from the audience. It was screened at the Cannes Film Festival on 14 May 2008.

The Last Princess was released on DVD on 12 December 2008 in Japan. It charted at number four on the Oricon DVD chart.

On 28 June 2010 it was released in the United Kingdom and Ireland on DVD by 4Digital Asia.

Staff

 Director: Shinji Higuchi
 Screenplay: Kazuki Nakashima
 Original Screenplay: Ryūzō Kikushima, Hideo Oguni, Shinobu Hashimoto, Akira Kurosawa
 Music: Naoki Satō
 Production: Toho, Cine-Bazaar
 Distribution: Toho

See also

The Hidden Fortress (1958)

References

External links
 

2008 films
Adaptations of works by Akira Kurosawa
Films directed by Shinji Higuchi
Remakes of Japanese films
Toho films
Films scored by Naoki Satō
2000s Japanese films